Adekunle Shamusideen Lawal (8 February 1934 – 27 November 1980) was a Nigerian Naval Admiral who served as military Governor of Lagos State from 1975 to 1977 and military Governor of Imo State from 1977 to 1978.

Early life and education
Adekunle Shamusideen Lawal was born on 8 February 1934 to Ayinde Sulemon Lawal and Ejide Afusat Disu-Lawal in Lagos, Western Region, British Nigeria now Lagos State Nigeria.

He started his education at Holy Cross Cathedral School, Lagos, Nigeria (1942–1945). St Peters Faji School, Lagos  Nigeria (1945–1949). His secondary education was completed at the Methodist Boys’ High School in Lagos (1950–1955), he studied at College of Technology, Yaba, Lagos, after which he went on to receive his Advanced Level Certificate of Education (A-levels) in three subjects (1958). He worked with the Ministry of Works and Survey in Kano, Nigeria as Assistant Technical Officer (1959). He attended the Ahmadu Bello University, Zaria, Nigeria (1960–1963), from where he graduated in 1963 with B.Sc.(Eng) Honors. He had a CMarEng and FIMarEng (Chartered member and a Fellow member of the Institute of Marine Engineering) and CNSE and FNSE (Chartered and a Fellow member of the Nigerian Society of Engineers), and FSS and PSC.

Lawal joined the Royal Nigerian Navy in September 1963 as a Sub-Lieutenant. In 1964 he was promoted to Lieutenant. In March 1964 he attended a Marine Engineering course with the Royal Naval Ships in Rotterdam, Holland. In 1966 he was promoted to Lieutenant Commander. From 1969 to 1971, he attended the Defence Naval Staff College in Wellington, India, where he received his M.Sc.(Eng). He was Chief of Material in the Nigerian Navy from 1973 to 1978 and was a member of the Supreme Military Council S.M.C. from 1972 to 1975 during the General Yakubu Gowon administration. Lawal was also appointed to the Board of the Nigerian Port Authority as a full Board Member from 1972 to 1975. Lawal also served as the Chief Engineer on numerous naval vessels including the NNS Ogoja, NNS Beecroft and the NNS Nigeria during his time with the Nigerian Navy.

Military governorship
He was appointed Military Governor of Lagos State in July 1975 after the Nigerian Civil War brought General Murtala Mohammed to power. As the governor of the most populous state in Nigeria, one of the major challenges faced by his administration was managing the chaotic traffic problem. During the World Black and African Festival of Arts and Culture, he implemented an odd-even rationing traffic system to ease congestion in the state. Car owners whose license plates began with even numbers were not allowed on most streets on Mondays, Wednesdays and Fridays, and those with odd numbers on Tuesdays, Thursdays and Saturdays. He was Lagos State Military Governor until 1977 when he was transferred to become governor of Imo State in 1977. He held this position until July 1978, after which he resumed his career in the Nigerian Navy.

Lawal voluntarily retired from the Nigerian Navy as an admiral in 1979, and after an illness he died in November 1980.

References

Yoruba military personnel
Governors of Lagos State
Governors of Imo State
1934 births
1980 deaths
Yoruba politicians
Lagos State politicians
Ahmadu Bello University alumni